Z0, Z0 or Z0 may refer to:

 Characteristic impedance, a ratio used in electronics
 Impedance of free space, a physical constant
 Z boson, an elementary particle that mediates the weak force
 a rare rail transport modelling scale
 Roughness length, a factor used in wind speed calculations
 Z0 sex-determination system in biology